The creek groove-toothed swamp rat (Pelomys fallax) is a species of rodent in the family Muridae.
It is found in Angola, Burundi, Democratic Republic of the Congo, Kenya, Malawi, Mozambique, Namibia, Rwanda, Tanzania, Uganda, Zambia, and Zimbabwe.
Its natural habitats are moist savanna and pastureland.

References
 Dieterlen, F. 2004.  Pelomys fallax.   2006 IUCN Red List of Threatened Species.   Downloaded on 19 July 2007.

Pelomys
Mammals described in 1852
Taxa named by Wilhelm Peters
Taxonomy articles created by Polbot